Schiesser or Schießer is a German surname. Notable people with the surname include:

Fritz Schiesser (born 1954), Swiss lawyer and politician
Giaco Schiesser (born 1953), Swiss cultural theorist
Kaspar Schiesser (1916–2007), Swiss long-distance runner

German-language surnames